Sportclub Young Fellows Juventus is a professional Swiss football club based in Zürich. It was founded in 1992 following a merger between Young Fellows Zürich (established in 1903) and Società Calcistica Italiana Juventus Zurigo (1922).

The team currently plays in the Swiss third division.

Honours 
Swiss Cup: 1936 (as Young Fellows Zurich)

Current squad 
As of 31 August 2022.

Notable players 
 Alessandro Frigerio, 1936–1937 Nationalliga top goalscorer, participated in the 1938 FIFA World Cup
 Fausto dos Santos, 1933, participated in the World Cup 1930
 Fernando Giudicelli, 1933, participated in the World Cup 1930
 Sándor Kocsis, 1957–1958, member of the Hungarian Olympic Champion team (1950)
 Željko Matuš, 1965–1969, Olympic champion in 1960, participated in 1960 European Nations' Cup and the 1962 FIFA World Cup

External links 
  

 
Young Fellows Juventus
Association football clubs established in 1992
1992 establishments in Switzerland